Baron Godolphin is a title that was created three times: first in the Peerage of England, next in the Peerage of Great Britain, and then in the Peerage of the United Kingdom.

The first creation, as Baron Godolphin, of Rialton in the County of Cornwall, was in the Peerage of England in September 1684 for Sidney Godolphin, a leading politician of the late seventeenth and early eighteenth centuries and former MP for Helston in Cornwall. In 1704 he was made a Knight of the Garter, and in December 1706 he was created Viscount Rialton and Earl of Godolphin. Upon his death in 1712, all these titles passed to his son Francis.

The second creation, as Baron Godolphin, of Helston in the County of Cornwall, was in the Peerage of Great Britain in 1735 for Francis Godolphin, 2nd Earl of Godolphin, with remainder, in default of male issue of his own, to the male issue of his deceased uncle Henry Godolphin, the Dean of St Paul's. The 2nd Earl died on 17 January 1766. The Godolphin earldom, the Rialton viscounty, and Godolphin barony of 1684 became extinct; but the Godolphin barony of 1735 devolved according to the special remainder upon his cousin Francis Godolphin, 2nd Baron Godolphin. He had previously represented Helston in the House of Commons. On his death in 1785 this title became extinct as well.

The third creation, as Baron Godolphin, of Farnham Royal in the County of Buckingham, was in the Peerage of the United Kingdom on 14 May 1832 for Lord Francis Osborne, the second son of Francis Osborne, 5th Duke of Leeds. His grandmother was Lady Mary Godolphin, daughter of 2nd Earl of Godolphin, who had married Thomas Osborne, 4th Duke of Leeds. On Lord Godolphin's death in 1850, the barony passed to his eldest son George, who also inherited the dukedom of Leeds from his cousin in 1859. The Godolphin barony of 1832 and the dukedom of Leeds remained united until the death of Sir D'Arcy Osborne, 12th Duke of Leeds in 1964, when both titles became extinct.

Barons Godolphin: First creation (1684)
Sidney Godolphin, 1st Earl of Godolphin, 1st Baron Godolphin (1645–1712)
Francis Godolphin, 2nd Earl of Godolphin, 2nd Baron Godolphin (1678–1766) (created Baron Godolphin in 1735)

Barons Godolphin: Second creation (1735)
Francis Godolphin, 2nd Earl of Godolphin, 1st Baron Godolphin (1678–1766) 
Francis Godolphin, 2nd Baron Godolphin (1707–1785)

Barons Godolphin; Third creation (1832)
 Francis Godolphin Osborne, 1st Baron Godolphin (1777–1850)
 George Godolphin Osborne, 2nd Baron Godolphin (1802–1872) (succeeded as Duke of Leeds in 1859)

References

Extinct baronies in the Peerage of Great Britain
 Baron
Noble titles created in 1684
Noble titles created in 1735
Noble titles created in 1832
Noble titles created for UK MPs
Peerages created with special remainders